Zinc finger protein 674 is a protein that in humans is encoded by the ZNF674 gene.

Function

This gene encodes a zinc finger protein with an N-terminal Kruppel-associated box-containing (KRAB) domain and 11 Kruppel-type C2H2 zinc finger domains. Like other zinc finger proteins, this gene may function as a transcription factor. This gene resides on an area of chromosome X that has been implicated in nonsyndromic X-linked mental retardation. Alternative splicing results in multiple transcript variants encoding different isoforms.

References

Further reading 

Human proteins